Thea Bowman, FSPA (born Bertha Elizabeth Bowman; December 29, 1937 – March 30, 1990) was a Black Catholic religious sister, teacher, musician, liturgist and scholar who made major contributions to the ministry of the Catholic Church toward African Americans. 

She became an evangelist among her people, assisted in the production of an African-American Catholic hymnal, and was a popular speaker on faith and spirituality in her final years, in addition to recording music. She also helped found the National Black Sisters' Conference to provide support for African-American women in Catholic religious life. She died of cancer in 1990. 

In 2018, the Diocese of Jackson opened her cause for sainthood and she was designated a Servant of God.

Life

Early life
Bowman was born in Yazoo City, Mississippi, in 1937. Her paternal grandfather (Edward Bowman) had been born a slave, but her father (Theon Edward Bowman) was a physician and her mother (Mary Esther Coleman) a teacher. She was raised in a Methodist home but, with her parents' permission, converted to the Catholic faith at the age of nine. Bowman attended Holy Child Jesus School, where she met her classmate Flonzie Brown Wright. She joined the Franciscan Sisters of Perpetual Adoration at La Crosse, Wisconsin at age 15, overcoming her parents' objections. Bowman was also part of the civil rights movement. 

Bowman attended Viterbo University, run by her congregation, and earned a B.A. in English in 1965. She went on to attend The Catholic University of America in Washington, D.C., where she earned an M.A. in English in 1969 and a Ph.D. in English in 1972, writing her doctoral thesis on Thomas More.

Educator
Bowman taught at an elementary school in La Crosse, Wisconsin, and then at Holy Child Jesus Catholic School, a high school in Canton, Mississippi. She later taught at her alma mater, Viterbo College in La Crosse and the Catholic University of America in Washington, D.C., as well as at Xavier University in New Orleans, Louisiana.

In his book Eleven Modern Mystics, Victor M. Parachin, a meditation teacher, notes Bowman's impact upon Catholic liturgical music in providing an intellectual, spiritual, historical, and cultural foundation for developing and legitimizing a distinct worship form for Black Catholics. Bowman had explained: "When we understand our history and culture, then we can develop the ritual, the music and the devotional expression that satisfy us in the Church."

Bowman became instrumental in the 1987 publication of a new Catholic hymnal, Lead Me, Guide Me: The African American Catholic Hymnal, the first such work directed to the Black community. James P. Lyke, Auxiliary Bishop of Cleveland (also an African-American), coordinated the hymnal project, saying it was born of the needs and aspirations of Black Catholics. Bowman was actively involved in selecting hymns to be included. The hymnal includes her essay titled "The Gift of African American Sacred Song." In it, she wrote, "Black sacred song is soulful song" and described it in five ways:

 holistic: challenging the full engagement of mind, imagination, memory, feeling, emotion, voice, and body;
 participatory: inviting the worshiping community to join in contemplation, in celebration and in prayer;
 real: celebrating the immediate concrete reality of the worshiping community – grief or separation, struggle or oppression, determination or joy – bringing that reality to prayer within the community of believers;
 spirit-filled: energetic, engrossing, intense;
 life-giving: refreshing, encouraging, consoling, invigorating, sustaining.

Evangelist
After she had spent 16 years in education, the Bishop of Jackson invited Bowman to become a consultant for intercultural awareness for his diocese. She then became more directly involved with ministry to her fellow African-Americans. She began to give inspirational talks to Black congregations and found a tremendous response by the people to whom she spoke. She brought her "ministry of joy" to far-ranging audiences, from Nigeria and Kenya to Canada, from the Virgin Islands to Hawaii, New York, and California. She called on Catholics to celebrate their differences and to retain their cultures, but to reflect their joy at being one in Christ, a joy which her audiences found her exhibiting to a remarkable degree, including with those of other faiths. In his book Hope Sings, So Beautiful: Graced Encounters Across the Color Line, Christopher Pramuk wrote:

Arguably no person in recent memory did more to resist and transform the sad legacy of segregation and racism in the Catholic Church than Thea Bowman ... who inspired millions with her singing and message of God's love for all races and faiths. Sister Thea awakened a sense of fellowship in people both within and well beyond the Catholic world, first and foremost through her charismatic presence.Bowman was diagnosed with breast cancer in 1984, after which she began rigorous treatments but maintained a robust speaking schedule. As her illness progressed, her fame grew and she made several overseas trips sponsored by friends, including to West Africa and Lourdes, France. She also became a household name in mainstream media, appearing on national news outlets and even being filmed for a documentary on her life after a terminal diagnosis.

During an appearance on the show 60 Minutes with Mike Wallace, she prodded him into saying "Black is beautiful" and she said:

I think the difference between me and some people is that I'm content to do my little bit. Sometimes people think they have to do big things in order to make change. But if each one would light a candle we'd have a tremendous light.

In 1989, shortly before her death, in recognition of her contributions to the service of the Church, she was awarded an honorary Doctorate in Religion by Boston College in Massachusetts.

Death
Just months before her death from cancer, Bowman spoke to the United States Conference of Catholic Bishops in 1989 from her wheelchair, and the bishops "powerfully and visibly moved, applauded her. When she finished they stood linking arms and singing as Thea led them in the spiritual, 'We Shall Overcome'." Harry Belafonte met her in Mississippi in 1989 hoping to do a film on her life, though the project did not materialize. 

Less than a week before her death, the University of Notre Dame announced that it would award Bowman the 1990 Laetare Medal. It was presented posthumously at the 1990 commencement exercises. She died on March 30, 1990, aged 52, in Canton, Mississippi, and was buried with her parents in Memphis, Tennessee.

Legacy
The 25th anniversary of her death brought forth numerous tributes. Her 1988 albums, Songs of My People and 'Round the Glory Manger, released on stereo audiocassette by the Daughters of St. Paul, were re-released in 2020 for the 30th anniversary of Bowman's death under the title, Songs of My People: The Complete Collection.

Thea Bowman AHANA and Intercultural Center
Boston College instituted the Thea Bowman AHANA and Intercultural Center (African, Hispanic, Asian, Native American), which in 2015 inaugurated an annual Thea Bowman Legacy Day. At the inaugural event of the legacy day, the keynote speaker mentioned how Bowman had stressed the importance of education for Blacks, and how she had legitimized a distinct form of worship for Black Catholics.

Sister Thea Bowman Foundation
Shortly before her death, the Sister Thea Bowman Black Catholic Educational Foundation was established to raise scholarship money, on a national scale, for underserved students of color who sought post-secondary education but did not have the means to attend - an endeavor Bowman saw as key to raising up the Black people. She conceived of the foundation as early as 1984 and articulated its mission for the students: "Walk with us. Don't walk behind us and don't walk in front of us; walk with us." The vision was brought to life in 1989 by founder Mary Lou Jennings under the guidance and direction of Sister Thea Bowman. By 2015 it had put more than 150 African American students through college.

Cause for canonization
A cause for canonization was opened for Bowman by the Diocese of Jackson in mid-2018, gaining her an official designation as a Servant of God, the first of the four steps toward sainthood. At the United States Conference of Catholic Bishops' 2018 Fall General Assembly, the Committee on Canonical Affairs and Church Governance indicated unanimous support for the advancement of Sister Thea Bowman's canonization cause on the diocesan level.

Institutions named after Bowman
 Thea Bowman House at Boston College
 Thea Bowman AHANA and Intercultural Center, Boston College
 Thea Bowman Center, Cleveland, Ohio
 Thea Bowman Community Health Center, Detroit
 Thea Bowman House, Utica, New York
 Thea Bowman Leadership Academy, Gary, Indiana
 Thea Bowman Residence, Amityville, New York
 Thea Bowman Spirituality Center, Raymond, Mississippi
 Thea Bowman Women's Center, Philadelphia
 Thea House Catholic Campus Ministry Center, Greensboro, North Carolina
 Sister Thea Bowman Academy, Wilkinsburg, Pennsylvania
 Sister Thea Bowman Catholic School, Jackson, Mississippi
 Sister Thea Bowman Center for Women, Siena College, Loudonville, New York
 Sister Thea Bowman DRVC Gospel Choir, Diocese of Rockville Centre, New York
 Sister Thea Bowman Grade School, East St. Louis, Illinois
 Sister Thea Bowman Hall at Loyola University Maryland
 Sister Thea Bowman House (Catholic Campus Ministry) at North Carolina Agricultural and Technical State University, Greensboro

Thea Bowman Hall at Sacred Heart University

Works
 Bowman, Thea (1985). Families, Black and Catholic, Catholic and Black. Washington, DC: United States Catholic Conference. Commission on Marriage and Family Life. .
 
 
 Bowman, Thea; Cepress, Celestine (1993). Sister Thea Bowman, Shooting Star: Selected Writings and Speeches. La Crosse, WI: Saint Mary's Press. . OCLC 28935744.
 Bowman, Thea; Nutt, Maurice J. (2009). Thea Bowman: In My Own Words. Liguori, MO: Liguori Publications. . – index of Bowman's speeches, writings, and interviews, with a brief biographical sketch and epilogue.

References

Further reading
 Nutt, Maurice J. Thea Bowman: Faithful and Free. Collegeville: Liturgical Press, 2019. . OCLC 1101785462.
 Nutt, Maurice J. An Hour with Thea Bowman. (pamphlet) Liguori, MO:  Liguori Publications, 2018. .
 Smith, Charlene; Feister, John. Thea's Song: The Life of Thea Bowman. Orbis Books, 2010. .

External links
 Sister Thea Bowman Foundation
 The Legacy of Sister Thea Bowman
 "Are you walkin' with me?" Sister Thea Bowman – University of Mississippi documentary
 Christian Educators of the 20th Century: Thea Bowman – Biola University
 Sister Thea Bowman: Cause for Canonization
 

1937 births
1990 deaths
20th-century American non-fiction writers
20th-century American women writers
20th-century Roman Catholics
African-American Catholics
African-American religious leaders
African-American Roman Catholic religious sisters and nuns
African-American writers
American religious leaders
American Servants of God
American women non-fiction writers
American writers about music
Boston College alumni
Burials in Tennessee
Catholics from Mississippi
Catholics from Wisconsin
Catholic University of America alumni
Catholic University of America faculty
Converts to Roman Catholicism from Methodism
Deaths from cancer in Mississippi
Laetare Medal recipients
People from Canton, Mississippi
People from Yazoo City, Mississippi
Religious leaders from Mississippi
Roman Catholic writers
Third Order Regular Franciscans
Venerated African-American Catholics
Viterbo University alumni
Viterbo University faculty
Writers from La Crosse, Wisconsin
Writers from Mississippi